is a run and gun video game released in arcades by SNK in 1990 for the Neo Geo MVS. It was released for the Neo Geo AES home console in 1991.

Gameplay 

Gameplay consists of battling through large numbers of enemies, collecting power-ups and defeating several end-of-stage bosses. In addition to the normal gun, the player can gain and use other weapons such as flamethrowers and rocket launchers. However ammunition is limited and players can switch weapons to conserve ammo. Bosses require the player to shoot their weak spots repeatedly. In between stages the player has to choose whether to ascend or descend in an elevator which will randomly determine if the player will proceed to the next stage. If the player picks the wrong elevator button, the player will have to traverse through a dangerous sub-level before proceeding to the next stage. After passing stages one till six, the player will be faced with a computer room with eight doors, which randomly determine which of the previous six bosses the player will face, the final ammunition room or the chance to face Cyber-Lip itself.

Plot 
In the year 2016 the federal government approved a space colony project in response to global overpopulation. By 2019, the Colony CO5 was the stronghold for androids. However many androids were found to be defective. The next year, the government had a supercomputer called Cyber-Lip built to control the androids. The androids were trained to combat an incoming alien invasion. Now the year is 2030 and humankind is in jeopardy from the alien and maverick android forces combined. Two of the military's best veteran androids Rick and Brook have been sent as a last-ditch effort to repel the invaders and destroy the evilly reprogrammed Cyber-Lip.

Development and release 

The game was ported over to the Neo Geo CD system in 1995. The CD version features improved voice acting and added a short introduction to the game explaining the plot.

Reception 

In Japan, Game Machine listed Cyber-Lip on their December 15, 1990 issue as being the fourth most-popular arcade game at the time. In North America, it was the top-grossing new video game on the RePlay arcade charts in December 1990. RePlay later reported the game to be the sixth most-popular arcade game in January 1991. The title was met with mixed critical reception from reviewers since its initial release in arcades and later on Neo Geo AES.

AllGames Kyle Knight regarded Cyber-Lip as an inferior Contra clone, criticizing the inability to shoot diagonally or down when jumping but commended the hand-drawn graphics and praised the audio design. Consoles Pluss F. Orlans and J.B. Aerstut, as well as Player Ones Cyril Drevet, commended the animated sequences, audiovisual presentation, orchestra-like sountrack and playability but the former publication criticized the presence of unlimited continues, stating that the feature lowered interest in the game. Likewise, GameFans four reviewers gave positive remarks to the character animations, audio and boss fights but unanimously criticized its short length.

French magazine Joystick commented in a positive light in regards to the visuals and two-player mode, as well as the ability to save progress via memory card. Both Superjuegos Alberto Pascual and Tilts François Hermelin, as well as Génération 4s Jean Delaite, praised the audiovisual presentation and animations but Pascual felt mixed in regards to the difficulty and originality on display. ACEs David Upchurch also commended the presentation and enjoyable gameplay but regarded this area as unoriginal and mindless. Computer and Video Games Mean Machines noted its high difficulty but felt unimpressed, criticizing the lack of originality and gameplay for being dull.

In 2014, HobbyConsolas identified Cyber-Lip as one of the twenty best games for the Neo Geo CD.

Notes

References

External links 
 Cyber-Lip at GameFAQs
 Cyber-Lip at Giant Bomb
 Cyber-Lip at Killer List of Videogames
 Cyber-Lip at MobyGames

1990 video games
ACA Neo Geo games
Arcade video games
Cooperative video games
Cyberpunk video games
Multiplayer and single-player video games
Neo Geo games
Neo Geo CD games
Nintendo Switch games
PlayStation Network games
PlayStation 4 games
Run and gun games
SNK games
Hamster Corporation games
Windows games
Xbox One games
Video games developed in Japan